Rosina Henley (1890-1978) was an American actress and screenwriter active during Hollywood's silent era. She was married to British film director Harley Knoles, with whom she frequently collaborated.

Biography 
Rosina was born in Manhattan to actor E.J. Henley and opera singer Helen Bertram. Her father died when she was young, and she was raised by her mother.

She made her own stage debut in 1907 at the age of 15, and from there forged a career as a stage actress. She and her mother moved to Los Angeles in 1910, where she continued performing and took on motion picture acting work.

She made her debut as a scenarist on 1920s Guilty of Love, directed by her future husband. After their marriage, the pair relocated to London, where they continued their work in the industry.

Her last known credit was on 1922's The Bohemian Girl. She died on July 5, 1978, and was survived by her son, author William Henry Knoles (pen name Clyde Allison).

Selected filmography 
As actress:

 Courage for Two (1919)
 Wanted: A Mother (1918)
 The Gates of Gladness (1918)
 The Strong Way (1917)
Adventures of Carol (1917)
 The Burglar (1917)
 Health by the Year (1915) (short)
 The Sign of the Cross (1914)
 The Lightning Conductor (1914)

As writer:

 The Bohemian Girl (1922)
 Carnival (1921)
 A Romantic Adventuress (1920)
 Guilty of Love (1920)

References 

American women screenwriters
American film actresses
20th-century American actresses
Actresses from New York City
Screenwriters from New York (state)
Writers from Manhattan
1890 births
1978 deaths
20th-century American women writers
20th-century American screenwriters